Super Bowl XI was an American football game between the American Football Conference (AFC) champion Oakland Raiders and the National Football Conference (NFC) champion Minnesota Vikings to decide the National Football League (NFL) champion for its 1976 season. The Raiders defeated the Vikings by the score of 32–14 to win their first Super Bowl. The game was played on January 9, 1977, at the Rose Bowl in Pasadena, California. This remains the earliest scheduled calendar date for a Super Bowl.

This was the Raiders’ second Super Bowl appearance after losing Super Bowl II. They posted a 13–1 regular season record before defeating the New England Patriots and the Pittsburgh Steelers in the playoffs. The Vikings were making their fourth Super Bowl appearance after posting an 11–2–1 regular season record and playoff victories over the Washington Redskins and the Los Angeles Rams. The Vikings became the first team to lose four Super Bowls, a record they held until the Denver Broncos lost their fifth Super Bowl to the Seattle Seahawks in Super Bowl XLVIII. The Vikings had not won in their previous three attempts, losing Super Bowl IV to the Kansas City Chiefs in the final Super Bowl before the AFL–NFL merger and following that up with losses in Super Bowls VIII and IX. The Raiders were the first original AFL team to win a Super Bowl in the post-merger era.

Super Bowl XI was dominated by the Raiders. Oakland gained a Super Bowl record 429 yards, including a Super Bowl record 288 yards in the first half, en route to winning Super Bowl XI. After a scoreless first quarter, Oakland scored on three consecutive possessions to take a 16–0 lead at halftime. The Raiders also had two fourth quarter interceptions, including cornerback Willie Brown’s 75-yard return for a touchdown. Oakland wide receiver Fred Biletnikoff, who had 4 catches for 79 yards that set up three Raider touchdowns, was named the game’s Most Valuable Player (MVP). Among the wide receivers who have won the Super Bowl MVP, Biletnikoff was the only one to not have gained 100 yards in his performance until Cooper Kupp in Super Bowl LVI.

Background
The NFL awarded Super Bowl XI to Pasadena, California on March 19, 1975 at the owners' meetings held in Honolulu. After awarding two consecutive Super Bowl host sites during both the 1972 and 1973 owners' meetings, respectively, the league went back to awarding only one host site at this meeting. However, the winner was still provided with nearly two years of preparation time. A total of six cities submitted bids: Pasadena (Rose Bowl), Los Angeles (Coliseum), Dallas, Houston, New Orleans, and Montreal. Pasadena won on the sixth ballot, with the stadium's capacity (104,701) the leading factor.

The selection of Pasadena was mildly controversial. For the first time, the Super Bowl would be played stadium that never housed an NFL franchise. The city of Pasadena entered the bidding last-minute, in an effort to address rising maintenance costs of the stadium. At the time, the Rose Bowl had no permanent major football tenant (UCLA did not move in until 1982) outside of single neutral site games such as the Rose Bowl Game and Pasadena Bowl. Super Bowl XI would take place only eight days after the 1977 Rose Bowl on the same field. Stadium officials expressed confidence that the turf would be in good condition. Pac-8 executive director Wiles Hallock, along with some individual members of the Tournament of Roses Committee opposed the city's bid. However, former Pasadena mayor Don Yokaitis, who made the presentation, successfully touted the stadium's prestige, tradition, and capacity.

Oakland Raiders

This game marked the second Super Bowl appearance for the Oakland Raiders, who lost Super Bowl II. Two years after their Super Bowl loss, the Raiders hired John Madden as their head coach. Under Madden, the Raiders had posted in his 8 seasons an 83–22–7 record (counting ties, this was a .772 winning percentage, second for any NFL team behind only the Vikings’ .781). Nevertheless, Super Bowl XI was the first time Madden led his team to a league championship game. They had been eliminated in all six of their previous playoff appearances, including five losses in the AFC Championship Game.

The Raiders offense was led by quarterback Ken Stabler, who finished as the top rated passer in the AFC, passing for 2,737 yards and 27 touchdowns. His 66.7 completion percentage (194 completions out of 291 attempts) was the second highest in the league. Stabler's main passing weapon was wide receiver Cliff Branch, who caught 46 passes for 1,111 yards (24.2 yards per catch average) and 12 touchdowns. Fred Biletnikoff was also a reliable deep threat, with 43 receptions for 551 yards and 7 touchdowns, while tight end Dave Casper recorded 53 receptions for 691 yards and 10 touchdowns.

In addition to their great passing attack the Raiders also had a powerful running game, led by fullback Mark van Eeghen (1,012 rushing yards, 17 receptions) and halfback Clarence Davis (516 rushing yards, 27 receptions). Another reason for the Raiders' success on offense was their offensive line, led by left tackle Art Shell and left guard Gene Upshaw, as well as perennial All-Pro center Dave Dalby.

Injuries early in the season forced the Raiders to switch from a 4–3 to a 3–4 defense. The switch benefited the team, as they won their last 10 games and finished the regular season with the best record in the league, 13–1. The Raiders' defense was anchored by great linebackers, such as Phil Villapiano and Ted Hendricks, while defensive end Otis Sistrunk anchored the defensive line. Their defensive secondary was extremely hard-hitting and talented, led by safeties Jack Tatum and George Atkinson, and cornerbacks Skip Thomas and Willie Brown.

Brown, Upshaw, Biletnikoff and running back Pete Banaszak were the only holdovers from the Oakland team that was defeated nine years earlier in Super Bowl II.

Many accused the Raiders defense of being overly aggressive, especially Atkinson, who inflicted a severe concussion on Pittsburgh Steelers wide receiver Lynn Swann in the previous season's AFC Championship Game. Atkinson added to that reputation as the Raiders advanced through the playoffs to Super Bowl XI, as Atkinson inflicted another concussion to Swann in the Raiders' 1976 season opener. In the Raiders' 24–21 playoff win over the New England Patriots, Atkinson broke the nose of Patriots tight end Russ Francis. In reaction, Pittsburgh head coach Chuck Noll complained of a "criminal element" in Atkinson's play. Atkinson himself denied deliberately trying to injure anyone and pointed out that at 6′0″ and 185 pounds, he was one of the smallest players on the field. The Raiders and their fans were often known to counter these accusations against Atkinson and Jack Tatum by pointing out the physical way that Pittsburgh cornerback Mel Blount covered Oakland's speedy split end Cliff Branch.

Two of the Raiders' players (whose names were not revealed) bought marijuana from Red Hot Chili Peppers singer Anthony Kiedis' father, Blackie Dammett, smoked it before the game, and played the game under the effects of the drug. This was revealed on Kiedis’ biography from 2004, Scar Tissue.

Minnesota Vikings

The Vikings, coached by Bud Grant, won the NFC Central for the eighth time in the last nine seasons with an 11–2–1 record, and advanced to their fourth Super Bowl in eight years. They were the only team who had lost three Super Bowls (they had previously lost Super Bowls IV, VIII and IX), and did not want to be the first one to lose four. They were the first team to appear in a fourth Super Bowl.

Once again, the Vikings had a powerful offense led by 36-year-old quarterback Fran Tarkenton and running back Chuck Foreman. In his 16th NFL season, Tarkenton was already the league's all-time leader in pass completions (3,186), passing yards (41,802), and touchdown passes (308). He had another fine season in 1976, completing 61.9 percent of his passes for 2,961 yards, 17 touchdowns, and only 8 interceptions. Foreman had the best season of his career, rushing for 1,155 yards and 13 touchdowns, while also catching 55 passes for 567 yards and another touchdown. Fullback Brent McClanahan also contributed 634 combined rushing and receiving yards. The Vikings also added two new weapons to their offense: veteran wide receiver Ahmad Rashad and rookie wide receiver Sammy White combined for 104 receptions, 1,577 receiving yards, and 13 touchdowns, while tackle Ron Yary once again anchored the offensive line.

The Vikings' "Purple People Eaters" defense, anchored by Carl Eller, Jim Marshall, and Alan Page, were also dominating teams again. During this regular season, they led the NFC in fewest points allowed (176). Also, defensive back Nate Wright led the team with 7 interceptions for 47 yards, while safety Paul Krause had 2 interceptions for 21 yards. Pro Bowl linebacker Matt Blair intercepted two passes and recovered five fumbles.

Tarkenton became the second quarterback to start three Super Bowls, following his Super Bowl VIII counterpart Bob Griese. Eleven players were on the roster for Super Bowl IV, VIII, IX, and XI for the Vikings: Bobby Bryant, Fred Cox, Carl Eller, Wally Hilgenberg, Paul Krause, Jim Marshall, Alan Page, Mick Tingelhoff, Ed White, Roy Winston and Ron Yary.

Playoffs

The Vikings went on to dominate the Washington Redskins, 35–20, and then defeated the Los Angeles Rams, 24–13, in the playoffs. Ten of the Vikings’ points in the NFC Championship Game came from blocked kicks.

The Raiders overcame an 11-point fourth-quarter deficit to defeat the New England Patriots, 24–21, with the aid of a penalty call against the Patriots. New England's Ray Hamilton was tagged for roughing the passer in the fourth quarter, turning an incomplete pass on 3rd and 18 into a first down, and the Raiders went on to score on Stabler's 1-yard touchdown run with 14 seconds left in the contest.

In the AFC Championship Game Oakland then faced the Pittsburgh Steelers, a team that had won the two previous Super Bowls and defeated the Raiders in the playoffs in three out of the last four seasons. However, coming into this game without injured starting running backs Franco Harris and Rocky Bleier, the Steelers were soundly thrashed this time around, losing to Oakland, 24–7.

This was the first Super Bowl game to match both conferences’ No. 1 seeds, the first one held in the Rose Bowl, the last Super Bowl to finish under daylight and the last where both teams’ placekickers (Minnesota's Fred Cox and Oakland's Errol Mann) used the straight-on style. Scheduled on the 9th day of January, the game marks the earliest Super Bowl played during the calendar year. The regular season started one week earlier than usual in order to avoid having playoff games on Christmas Day, which fell on a Saturday in 1976. By moving the season up, the divisional playoffs were held December 18 and 19, and the conference championship games Sunday, December 26. The local starting time for this Super Bowl, 12:47 pm Pacific Time, also was the earliest in history, two minutes earlier than Super Bowl VII at the nearby Los Angeles Memorial Coliseum in 1973.

The Raiders became the first West Division team from either conference to reach a post-merger Super Bowl.

Broadcasting
The game was televised in the United States by NBC, with play-by-play announcer Curt Gowdy and color commentator Don Meredith. This was Meredith's last broadcast with NBC, as he returned to ABC to rejoin the Monday Night Football crew for the  season, where he had been a commentator from  through . Bryant Gumbel, Lee Leonard, and analyst John Brodie anchored NBC's pregame, halftime, and postgame coverage. With kickoff at 12:30 p.m. PST, this remains the most recent Super Bowl completed in daylight.

Entertainment

Pregame festivities
The pregame festivities featured the Los Angeles Unified School District (LAUSD) All-City Band and frisbee dog Ashley Whippet. Later, singer Vikki Carr sang "America the Beautiful". To date, this is the only game in Super Bowl history that the national anthem was not sung. This was only the second time in the game's history that "America the Beautiful" was sung before a game, as Charley Pride sang the song at Super Bowl VIII three years prior.

This was the first Super Bowl where the official coin toss was held at midfield three minutes prior to kickoff. Prior to 1976, the official toss was held 30 minutes prior to kickoff, with captains called to midfield three minutes prior to kickoff so the referee could inform fans and media of the results of the toss. Jim Tunney became the last referee to conduct the Super Bowl coin toss. The year before, former United States Secretary of the Navy John Warner became the first non-official to toss the coin. The next year, Chicago Bears great Red Grange (with Tunney as referee) began the tradition of celebrity coin tossers.

Halftime show
The halftime show was produced by Disney and was based on It's a Small World, an attraction at Disneyland and the Magic Kingdom. The show featured the cast members of The New Mickey Mouse Club. It was the first Super Bowl halftime show to include crowd participation as people in the stadium performed a mass card stunt on cue. The LAUSD All-City Band also played during the show.

Game summary

First quarter
The Raiders took the opening kickoff and advanced all the way to the Vikings’ 12-yard line, but came up empty after kicker Errol Mann hit the left upright on his 29-yard field goal attempt. Later in the quarter, after the teams exchanged punts, the Vikings had a great opportunity to score, when linebacker Fred McNeill blocked a punt from Ray Guy and recovered the ball on the Raiders' 3-yard line. The Vikings' special teams unit was known for blocking kicks, but this was the first time it had happened to Guy. (He had only three of his punts blocked in his 14-year Pro Football Hall of Fame career.) However, two plays later, Minnesota running back Brent McClanahan fumbled the ball while being tackled by Raiders linebacker Phil Villapiano, and linebacker Willie Hall recovered the ball for Oakland. The Raiders then marched 90 yards to the Vikings' 7-yard line, with a 35-yard run by Clarence Davis around left end from the Oakland 6-yard line breaking through Minnesota's front. On the drive's sixth play, quarterback Ken Stabler completed a 25-yard pass to tight end Dave Casper, with Casper breaking through what Stabler called "10 tackles."

Second quarter
Oakland, however, had to settle for a 24-yard field goal from Mann, giving them a 3–0 lead 48 seconds into the second quarter.

After forcing Minnesota to punt following a three-and-out, Oakland did even better the next time it got the ball. Stabler completed a 19-yard pass to Casper to reach the Vikings' 26. Running back Carl Garrett carried on three consecutive plays and gained 20 yards, then Stabler hit receiver Fred Biletnikoff along the right sideline for five yards to the 1-yard line. The 64-yard drive in 10 plays then concluded on a 1-yard touchdown pass from Stabler to Casper, increasing the Raiders' lead to 10–0 (the reception was Casper's fourth and final one of the game). On the Vikings' next possession, running back Chuck Foreman gained seven yards on first down and six yards on second down, but a holding penalty on Ron Yary made it second-down-and-13. Tarkenton threw an incomplete pass to rookie receiver Sammy White, then a long pass to Ahmad Rashad was broken up by defensive back Willie Brown, resulting in another three-and-out. Oakland got the ball back in excellent field position, after returner Neal Colzie returned Minnesota's punt 25 yards to the Vikings' 35-yard line. After three running plays, Stabler completed a 17-yard pass to Biletnikoff at the 1-yard line, and running back Pete Banaszak scored a touchdown on the next play, increasing Oakland's lead to 16–0 with 3:33 left in the second quarter, after Mann missed the extra point attempt. To this point, Minnesota had picked up only one first down. They added three more before halftime, including a meaningless 26-yard completion from Tarkenton to Foreman on the last play of the half, which ended up being their longest gain of the entire game. The score at halftime marked the fourth time in as many Super Bowl games that the Vikings failed to score in the first half.

Third quarter
The second half began with three consecutive punts, but then Colzie returned the Vikings' second punt of the quarter 12 yards to the Oakland 46-yard line. From there, the Raiders advanced to the Minnesota 23-yard line, aided by an 18-yard run by Davis and a 10-yard reception by wide receiver Cliff Branch, to set up Mann's 40-yard field goal to increase their lead to 19–0. After a few more seconds, the Vikings had gone 40 minutes without scoring, same as in all their previous Super Bowls, while as it turned out, Oakland had enough points to win, same as the three earlier games Minnesota had with Kansas City, Miami and Pittsburgh.

Tarkenton then threw three consecutive incomplete passes on their ensuing drive, forcing the Vikings to punt again. This loomed as the fifth three-and-out drive for Minnesota in the game. However, Oakland linebacker Ted Hendricks was penalized for running into the punter on the play, giving Minnesota a first down. Taking advantage of their second chance, the Vikings ended up with a 12-play, 68-yard drive as Tarkenton completed passes to Stu Voigt, Ahmad Rashad and Chuck Foreman for gains of 15, 21, and 10 yards. On the last play, Tarkenton threw an 8-yard touchdown pass to Sammy White, making the score 19–7.

Fourth quarter
The Raiders were forced to punt on their next drive, after they were unable to recover from Alan Page's 11-yard sack on first down. Then aided by Tarkenton's completions to White for gains of 14 and 18 yards, respectively, the Vikings advanced to the Oakland 37-yard line (The 18-yard completion to White featured an infamous hit from Jack Tatum that knocked Sammy White's helmet off, sending it and his mouthguard flying, but somehow White held on to the ball and recovered after being knocked out for a moment). However, on third down and 3, Hall intercepted a pass from Tarkenton and returned it 16 yards to the 46-yard line. Three plays later, Biletnikoff's 48-yard catch and run reception moved the ball to the Vikings' 2-yard line, setting up Banaszak's second rushing touchdown to increase Oakland's lead to 26–7. All three Raiders offensive touchdowns had been preceded on the previous play by key Biletnikoff receptions.

White returned the ensuing kickoff 19 yards to the Minnesota 32-yard line, and four plays later, Tarkenton completed a 25-yard pass to receiver Rashad to reach the Oakland 28-yard line. However, on the next play, defensive back Willie Brown intercepted a pass intended for White and returned it 75 yards for a touchdown. Although Mann missed the extra point attempt, the Raiders put the game out of reach, 32–7.

After both teams turned the ball over on downs, Minnesota drove 86 yards in 9 plays to score on a 14-yard touchdown pass from backup quarterback Bob Lee to Voigt. The touchdown cut Minnesota's deficit to 32–14, but by then there were only 25 seconds remaining in the game.

Stabler finished the game with 12 out of 19 pass completions for 180 yards and 1 touchdown. Davis, who was the top rusher in the game, gained 137 yards on just 16 rushing attempts, an average of 8.5 yards per carry. Of Davis' 16 carries, 11 were runs to the left side, which is where the blocking of guard Gene Upshaw, tackle Art Shell and Casper dominated defensive end Jim Marshall and linebacker Wally Hilgenberg. Marshall made no tackles in the game and Hilgenberg made only two. Oakland set a new rushing record for the Super Bowl with 266 yards gained. As of Super Bowl LVI, only the Washington Redskins have rushed for more yards, doing so in both Super Bowls XVII and XXII. The Raiders had 52 rushing carries, becoming the third consecutive Viking S. B. opponent to rush more than 50 times.

Casper finished the game with 4 receptions for 70 yards and 1 touchdown. Colzie returned 4 punts for a Super Bowl record 43 yards. Foreman had a solid performance for Minnesota, contributing 44 rushing yards and 62 receiving yards. Tarkenton completed 17 out of 35 pass attempts for 205 yards, 1 touchdown, and 2 interceptions. White recorded 163 total yards, catching 5 passes for 77 yards and 1 touchdown, rushing once for 7 yards, and returning 4 kickoffs for 79 yards. The Raiders won their first Super Bowl and according to Brown, winning Super Bowl XI "made up for the other Raiders who came before and didn’t have a chance to participate on a winning Super Bowl team. This victory meant not only a lot to me, it meant a lot to the entire Raider organization." The win was particularly satisfying for Brown, who scored a Super Bowl touchdown and earned his first championship ring after 14 years of professional football.

Box score

Final statistics
Sources: NFL.com Super Bowl XI , Super Bowl XI Play Finder Oak, Super Bowl XI Play Finder Min

Statistical comparison

Individual leaders

1Completions/attempts
2Carries
3Long gain
4Receptions
5Times targeted

Records set
The following records were set in Super Bowl XI, according to the official NFL.com box score and the ProFootball reference.com game summary. Some records have to meet NFL minimum number of attempts to be recognized. The minimums are shown (in parenthesis).

Turnovers are defined as the number of times losing the ball on interceptions and fumbles.

Starting lineups
Source:

Officials
 Referee: Jim Tunney #32 second Super Bowl (VI)
 Umpire: Lou Palazzi #51 third Super Bowl (IV, VII)
 Head linesman: Ed Marion #26 third Super Bowl (V, IX)
 Line judge: Bill Swanson #38 first Super Bowl 
 Back judge: Tom Kelleher #25 third Super Bowl (IV, VII)
 Field judge: Armen Terzian #23 first Super Bowl
 Alternate referee Gene Barth #14 worked Super Bowl XVIII as referee
 Alternate umpire Pat Harder #88 was alternate for Super Bowls V and XVI

Note: A seven-official system was not used until 1978

Aftermath
The Vikings' loss in Super Bowl XI meant the franchise finished with a 0–4 Super Bowl record under head coach Bud Grant, even though in the same eight-season span their regular season record was 87–24–1, which was the best in the NFL. In 2015, on the occasion of Super Bowl 50, Slate webpage writer Justin Peters watched all of the first 49 games over a two-month period. He called the Vikings "the worst franchise in Super Bowl history. Minnesota went to the Super Bowl four separate times from 1970 to 1977 and didn't score a single first-half point in any of those games. The Vikings had a really, really good defense, and their offense just kept on letting the defense down, game after game after game."

Grant coached Minnesota eight more seasons, but never managed to guide the team back to a Super Bowl. In fact, as of the 2021 season, this remains the Vikings' most recent appearance in a Super Bowl, although they have qualified for the postseason a further 23 times and have reached the NFC Championship six times in 1977, 1987, 1998, 2000, 2009 and 2017. Grant was the last surviving coach from the first 14 Super Bowls until his death on 11 March 2023.

Despite a few mediocre seasons, the Raiders would remain an NFL power until 1985 and win two more Super Bowls in their 1980 and 1983 seasons – the second after moving to Los Angeles in 1982. In contrast to their 13–1 1976 regular season, both of these would be won in major upsets. The Raiders would fall to mediocrity in the latter part of the 1980s and most of the 1990s when they were affected by stadium problems that saw them again playing in Oakland in 1995 – although they did reach the AFC Championship in 1991 and be demolished 51-3 by the Bills – before a 33–15 three-season record between 2000 and 2002 saw them return to the Super Bowl for the first time in 19 seasons, losing out to the Tampa Bay Buccaneers. Since then, the Raiders have been mainly NFL cellar-dwellers, with only two postseason appearances; one in 2016 and again in 2021, along with a record of seven straight seasons with no more than five victories between 2003 and 2009. Principal owner Al Davis died in 2011 and John Madden died on 28 December 2021. The picture of Madden celebrating this victory was on the cover of the next gen version of Madden NFL 23.

References

 
 Super Bowl official website
 Box Score at PFR
 
 
 
 
 https://www.pro-football-reference.com – Large online database of NFL data and statistics
 Super Bowl play-by-plays from USA Today (Last accessed July 20, 2008)
 All-Time Super Bowl Odds from The Sports Network (Last accessed October 16, 2005)

Super Bowl
1977 in American football
Oakland Raiders postseason
Minnesota Vikings postseason
American football competitions in California
1976 National Football League season
Sports competitions in Pasadena, California
1977 in sports in California
January 1977 sports events in the United States
20th century in Pasadena, California